Alessandro Lucarelli ( born 22 July 1977) is an Italian former professional footballer who last played for Parma as a defender.

Playing career
Alessandro Lucarelli started his professional career at Piacenza, whose youth sides he also represented. In 1997, he was sent out on loan to Leffe in order to gain first team experience, making 29 league appearances with the side in 1997–98 Serie C2. Leffe narrowly avoided relegation in  a relegation play-out. He became a more prominent member of the first team upon his return to Piacenza, where he spent four seasons as a regular. Playing for the first time in Serie A, Lucarelli avoided relegation with Piacenza in 1998–1999 but went down the following year after finishing bottom of the league. Piacenza and Lucarelli secured an immediate return to the top division the next year with a second-place finish in Serie B. In 2001–02, Piacenza finished 12th and this proved to be Lucarelli's final season with the club after 100 appearances in all competitions.

After leaving Piacenza in the summer of 2002, Lucarelli moved to Palermo, then in Serie B, where he spent just one season, making 28 league appearances for the Rosanero, who finished just outside of the promotion places. A brief spell at Brescia in the summer of 2003 lasted just two appearances in the 2003 UEFA Intertoto Cup, which would prove to be his only two appearances in European competition. In August of the same year, he moved to another Serie B side, this time Fiorentina, where he made 31 appearances as they were promoted to Serie A.

His hometown club, Livorno, noticed the defender's qualities and signed him for the 2004–05 Serie A season. He made 28 appearances in his only full season at the club and also scored his first league goals of his professional career as he bagged four goals. Livorno finished ninth in Serie A. Lucarelli moved to Reggina for the 2005–06 season and would spend two seasons at the club, twice achieving mid-table finishes before repeating the feat with Genoa in 2007–08, a club he had joined in the summer of 2007, having been exchanged to Siena from Reggina for Francesco Cozza, but immediately leaving for Genoa, where he signed a three-year contract. Genoa paid €1.9 million to Siena to acquire Lucarelli.

The following summer, 2008, he rejoined his brother Cristiano at Parma, who paid €1.2 million for his services. Parma were in Serie B at the time and Lucarelli helped Parma to promotion that season, making 39 appearances in all competitions. This was Lucarelli's third promotion from Serie B to A. Between 2009 and 2015 and across six seasons, Lucarelli made 193 Serie A appearances for the club. In his sixth season at the club, he became club captain. During his time at Parma, he entered the top 100 of players with most Serie A appearances, appearing 386 times for five clubs. Lucarelli was the only player to remain at Parma following the club's demotion to Serie D. He earned three successive promotions in the rebirth of the club from Serie D in 2015–16, Lega Pro to Serie B in 2016–17 and to Serie A in 2017–18. On 4 November 2017, Lucarelli became Parma's record holder for league appearances, moving ahead of Ivo Cocconi on the all-time list. On 27 May 2018, Lucarelli announced his retirement during Parma's promotion party at the Stadio Ennio Tardini, with Parma retiring his number 6 jersey.

Coaching career
In June 2017, Lucarelli began studying for his UEFA A Licence at Coverciano.

Personal life
Lucarelli was born in Livorno, the younger brother of Cristiano Lucarelli, who played for Livorno and the Italy national football team. Both the Lucarelli brothers captained their respective clubs for the 2006–07 season. Alessandro's son, Matteo, now plays for Bulgarian Tsarsko Selo, on loan from Parma.

Career statistics

Honours

Club 

 Parma
 Serie D: 2015–16

References

External links
RegginaCalcio.com 
gazzetta.it

1977 births
Living people
Sportspeople from Livorno
Association football defenders
Italian footballers
Piacenza Calcio 1919 players
U.C. AlbinoLeffe players
Palermo F.C. players
U.S. Livorno 1915 players
ACF Fiorentina players
Reggina 1914 players
A.C.N. Siena 1904 players
Genoa C.F.C. players
Parma Calcio 1913 players
Serie A players
Serie B players
Serie C players
Footballers from Tuscany